The 1973 Men's World Team Amateur Squash Championships were held in Johannesburg, South Africa and took place from August 16 to August 26, 1973.

Results

See also 
World Team Squash Championships
World Squash Federation
World Open (squash)

References 

World Squash Championships
Squash tournaments in South Africa
International sports competitions hosted by South Africa
Squash
Mens